The Dorchester Review, founded in 2011, is a semi-annual journal of history and historical commentary that describes itself as a non-partisan but "robustly polemical" outlet for "elements of tradition and culture inherent to Canadian experience that fail to conform to a stridently progressivist narrative."

Contents
The journal includes articles on history as well as historical commentary. The name Dorchester was chosen to honour the 1st Baron Dorchester —Sir Guy Carleton—who served as Governor of the Province of Quebec from 1768 to 1778, and Governor General of British North America  from 1785 to 1795. Dorchester defied General George Washington and encouraged escaped slaves to emigrate with the Loyalists to Canada. He also extended religious liberty to Roman Catholics and Jews under his officially Protestant regime. The editors explained in their first editorial in 2011 that the choice of "a bewigged British soldier, an ... unapologetic colonial governor from the pre-democratic era" is intended to underscore the magazine's belief that "history consists of more than a parade of secular modern progressives." As David Frum summarized the Review's approach to history, "The important thing to understand about 19th century Canada is that it was not a failed revolutionary state. It was a successful conservative state. The great achievement of Canadian history was precisely the achievement of self-rule within the context of institutional continuity."

The Review's editors wrote in the first issue's opening editorial:

We confess another potentially unpopular belief: that, at its core, Canada’s strength and advantage — that of a British liberal society with a strong French national enclave, resilient aboriginal communities, and a vital pluralism born of successive immigrant arrivals — would be void if polemically separated from its European, Judeo-Christian and Classical traditions, which is another answer to: why history. We are conscious and grateful heirs to an invaluable if variously pressured tradition of free expression and criticism that is found and defended with particular seriousness in the North Atlantic societies, and this we think should be recognized, protected, and always enhanced.

Founder

Founding editor C.P. Champion holds a Fellowship at Queen's University's Centre for International and Defence Policy. He is the author of The Strange Demise of British Canada, published in 2010 by McGill-Queen's University Press. He served as Director of Citizenship Policy in the office of Jason Kenney , where he oversaw production of the acclaimed 2009 Discover Canada citizenship test study guide, still in use today and described by the Globe and Mail as "a rare and significant attempt to reshape the national image." He worked at Ted Byfield's Alberta Report from 1994 to 1997 as a news reporter and typesetter.

His most recent book, Relentless Struggle: Saving the Army Reserve 1995-2019 (Durnovaria, 2019), which was informally peer-reviewed before publication by academics and senior military officers, including the former Commander of the Canadian Army, LGen Paul Wynnyk, who also wrote the foreword, explored how a series of Canadian defence ministers have failed to adequately support the army reserve since the early 1990s, following defence budget cuts under then Prime Minister Jean Chrétien, which, according to J. L. Granatstein severely strained both the Reserve's personnel and equipment. Champion himself joined the army reserve as a Private and underwent basic training at the age of 46.

Controversies
According to news reports, a 2019 Dorchester Review article by Champion entitled "Alberta’s Little History War," said that in Alberta classrooms, the "ongoing fad is that we need 'more' First Nations 'perspectives.'". He said this was faddish because he himself had got a "repetitive" dose of "oolichan, cedar masks, and Trickster stories" in his own elementary school experience during the 1970s. He criticized as "deplorable agitprop" the classroom activity to teach from an alleged Indigenous perspective —the KAIROS Blanket exercise—"brainwashes children into thinking of themselves as ‘settlers’ stealing the land — the kind of 'truth and reconciliation' that is not evidence-based but relies on 'knowledge keepers’ to 'foster truth.'" The blanket exercise has been widely used in Canada in response to the 2015 Truth and Reconciliation Commission (TRC) call for inclusion of indigenous history in school curriculum as essential for improved relationships with non-indigenous people. The TRC gathered approximately 7,000 testimonies from the survivors of residential schools over a six-year period—from 2008 to 2014, according to Justice Murray Sinclair.

Themes

The history wars
According to a 2013 Toronto Review of Books article, "The History Wars in Canada", in 1998, then-York University history professor, Jack Granatstein "fired the opening shot of the History Wars"—a "fierce conflict about the meaning and purpose" of Canadian history. In his 1998 book, Who Killed Canadian History?,  Jack Granatstein said that, since the late 1960s, a new generation of social historians in history departments have waged an ideological war with historians like himself, who defend the traditional narrative history, with a focus on chronology, and elite figures in political and military history. He said that in the writing and teaching of history in Canada, the teaching of "hard facts", has been replaced by distorted interpretations of the past that focus on "victimization and blame seeking". Among the reasons for these changes in historiography he included  multiculturalism and the whole child approach to learning.

In a 2013 article, Mark Sholdice argued that Champion was one of the "right-wing activists and scholars" leading the history wars in Canada, and moreover that he was "probably the most important Conservative historian in Canada" at that time. Champion's 2010 book, The Strange Demise of British Canada: The Liberals and Canadian Nationalism, 1964-1968, written as his doctoral thesis, Nova Britannia Revisited, between 2004 and 2007, anticipated the Harper administration's views on the writing and teaching of Canadian history. Sholdice added that in 2011, the history wars became a "tangible reality," with the Harper government favouring subjects such as the "military and the monarchy" for "historical attention", and "spending lavishly" on the "commemoration of the War of 1812."

Media
National Post columnist Barbara Kay described the Dorchester Review as "politically incorrect and iconoclastic" writing which resists "the prevailing progressivist view that historians must choose between a right and wrong side of history," without catering to a specific ideology. In the same article (2016), Kay reported that the Review core readership consisted of 500 readers—50% professionals and business people, 10% academics, 15-20% politicians, and 20-25% eclectic readers. David Frum greeted the Review's launch in 2011 as "one of the most exciting intellectual projects Canada has seen in a long while."  Jonathan Kay has described it as "the only high-level publication in Canada that examines our history and traditions without even a passing nod to academic fashions and identity politics." Former Conservative Prime Minister Stephen Harper was observed reading the magazine in Canada's House of Commons, contributing to its image as a right-wing publication.

Writing in the Literary Review of Canada, professor of European Studies Jerry White cited The Dorchester Review among works that "might...prompt readers to rethink the way in which not all liberals are Liberals and not all conservatives sound like the Conservatives."

The Review has been attacked by members of the alt-right for being insufficiently alarmed by large-scale immigration. Ricardo Duchesne faulted Australian contributor Gregory Melleuish as an example of how "Conservatives self-deceive themselves into believing what they dislike because they are afraid of leftist repercussions." The Review also published in its second issue an article highly critical of the treatment of Canadian Japanese during the Second World War.
	
In 2017 Champion criticized right-wing counter-protestors for co-opting the Canadian Red Ensign, saying he was "disappointed when the self-described traditionalists of the Proud Boys were captured on video provoking Indigenous protesters with the flag."

The journal's coverage of the failure to produce concrete evidence of any mass unmarked burials at Indian Residential Schools received international attention from The Spectator, among others. In follow-up, contributors Tom Flanagan and Brian Giesbrecht, and anthropologist Hymie Rubenstein criticized Canada's Crown-Indigenous Relations minister Marc Miller's rebuke of those that criticized "the nature and validity of these and other recovery efforts" following the announcement of the discovery of potentially unmarked grave at the St Joseph's Mission School.

Notable contributors
	
 George Jonas (1925-2016)
 Robin Fisher (historian)	
 Kevin Myers (Ireland)	
 Gregory Melleuish (Australia)
 Barbara Kay
 Éric Bédard (historian)
 Ken Coates		
 Andrew Roberts
 Conrad Black
 Craig Yirush
 Graeme Garrard
 Carolina Armenteros
 Patrice Dutil
 Patricia Phenix
 Michel Bock
 Charles-Philippe Courtois
 David Twiston Davies (1945-2020)		
 John Howard (Australia)
 Narindar Saroop (United Kingdom)	
 Robin Sears	
 Alastair Sweeny		
 Roger Noriega		
 Gil Troy	
 Paul Hollander (1932-2019)
 Richard Lebrun
 Frédéric Bastien 			
 David Frum		
 Serge Joyal [Canadian Senator - (L.)]		
 John O'Sullivan (columnist)
 Hugh Bicheno		
 Julian Thompson
 Barry Gough		
 J. L. Granatstein		
 Jonathan Kay
 Caroline Shenton		
 Andrew P. W. Bennett		
 Noah Richler
 Gary A. Mauser		
 Lionel Albert
 Tammy Nemeth		
 Paul Cowan
 Pat Stogran	
 Ian Brodie
 Christopher Dummitt		
 Randall Hansen			
 F. H. Buckley
 Randall Hansen
 Mathieu Bock-Côté		
 Kevin Gutzman		
 Jonathon Riley
 Rory MacLean
 Touraj Daryaee	
 Peter Hoffmann	
 Andrew Godefroy		
 Jürgen Rüttgers (Germany)	
 Randy Boyagoda	
 Allan Levine	
 Tom Flanagan
 Frank Dikötter (Hong Kong)
 James Allan (law professor) (Australia)

See also
 Conservatism in Canada
 List of Canadian magazines
 List of literary magazines
 Tory
 Traditionalist conservatism

References

External links
 

Magazines established in 2011
Cultural magazines published in Canada
History magazines published in Canada
2011 establishments in Canada
Magazines published in Ottawa
Conservative magazines published in Canada